List of rivers in Rio Grande do Sul (Brazilian State).

The list is arranged by drainage basin from north to south, with respective tributaries indented under each larger stream's name and ordered from downstream to upstream. All rivers in Rio Grande do Sul drain to the Atlantic Ocean.

By Drainage Basin

Atlantic Coast/Lagoa dos Patos 

Lagoa dos Patos is connected to the Atlantic by the Rio Grande inlet.
 
 Mampituba River
 Três Forquilhas River
 Maquiné River
 Tramandaí River
 Lagoa dos Patos
 Guaíba River
 Gravataí River
 Dos Sinos River
 Paranhana River
 Rolante River
 Jacuí River
 Caí River
 Maratá River
 Cadeia River
 Forromeco River
 Canastra River
 Jaguari River
 Pinhal River
 Do Ouro River
 Piaí River
 Caracol River
 Taquari River
 Taquari-Mirim River
 Forqueta River
 Forquetinha River
 Guaporé River
 Carreiro River
 São Domingos River
 Das Antas River
 Da Prata River
 Humaitã River (Turvo River)
 Da Telha River
 Ituim River
 Piraçupiá River (Santa Rita River)
 Quebra-Dentes River
 Lajeado Grande River
 Tomé River
 Tainhas River
 Camisas River
 Pardo River
 Botucaraí River
 Vacacaí River
 São Sepe River
 Vacacaí-Mirim River
 Soturno River
 Jacuizinho River
 Dos Caixões River
 Ivaí River
 Jacuí-Mirim River
 Ibirubá River
 Camaquã River
 São Lourenço River
 Arroio Pelotas
 São Gonçalo Channel
 Piratini River
 Lagoa Mirim
 Jaguarão River
 Arroio Chuí

Uruguay Basin 

 Uruguay River
 Río Negro
 Quaraí River
 Cati River
 Ibicuí River
 Ibirapuitã River
 Ibirapuitã Chico River
 Itu River
 Jaguari River
 Jaguarizinho River
 Santa Maria River
 Cacequi River
 Ibicuí da Armada River
 Ibicuí da Cruz River
 Ibicuí-Mirim River
 Toropi River
 Icamaquã River
 Do Meio River
 Piratini River
 Piraju River
 Ijuí River
 Ijuizinho River
 Conceição River
 Caxambu River
 Fiúza River
 Comandaí River
 Amandaú River
 Santo Cristo River
 Santa Rosa River
 Buricá River
 Caá-Iari River
 Turvo River
 Guarita River
 Ogarantim River (Fortaleza River)
 Da Várzea River
 Lajeado Grande River
 Passo Fundo River
 Erechim River
 Douradinho River
 Palomas River
 Azul River
 Dourado River
 Lambedor River
 Suzana River
 Apuaê River
 Inhandava River (Forquilha River)
 Pelotas River
 Bernardo José River
 Suçuarana River
 Socorro River
 Dos Touros River
 Cerquinha River

Alphabetically 

 Amandaú River
 Das Antas River
 Apuaê River
 Azul River
 Bernardo José River
 Boucaraí River
 Buricá River
 Caá-Iari River
 Cacequi River
 Cadeia River
 Caí River
 Dos Caixões River
 Camaquã River
 Camisas River
 Canastra River
 Carreiro River
 Cati River
 Caxambu River
 Cerquinha River
 Arroio Chuí
 Comandaí River
 Conceição River
 Douradinho River
 Dourado River
 Erechim River
 Fiúza River
 Forqueta River
 Forquetinha River
 Forromeco River
 Lajeado Grande River
 Gravataí River
 Guaíba River
 Guaporé River
 Guarita River
 Humaitã River (Turvo River)
 Ibicuí da Armada River
 Ibicuí da Cruz River
 Ibicuí River
 Ibicuí-Mirim River
 Ibirapuitã Chico River
 Ibirapuitã River
 Ibirubá River
 Icamaquã River
 Ijuí River
 Ijuizinho River
 Inhandava River (Forquilha River)
 Itu River
 Ituim River
 Ivaí River
 Jacuí River
 Jacuí-Mirim River
 Jacuizinho River
 Jaguarão River
 Jaguari River
 Jaguari River
 Jaguarizinho River
 Lambedor River
 Mampituba River
 Maquiné River
 Maratá River
 Do Meio River
 Río Negro
 Ogarantim River (Fortaleza River)
 Do Ouro River
 Palomas River
 Paranhana River
 Pardo River
 Passo Fundo River
 Pelotas River
 Arroio Pelotas
 Piaí River
 Pinhal River
 Piraçupiá River (Santa Rita River)
 Piraju River
 Piratini River
 Piratini River
 Da Prata River
 Quaraí River
 Quebra-Dentes River
 Rolante River
 Santa Maria River
 Santa Rosa River
 Santo Cristo River
 São Domingos River
 São Gonçalo Channel
 São Lourenço River
 São Sepe River
 Dos Sinos River
 Socorro River
 Soturno River
 Suçuarana River
 Suzana River
 Tainhas River
 Taquari River
 Taquari-Mirim River
 Da Telha River
 Tomé River
 Toropi River
 Dos Touros River
 Tramandaí River
 Três Forquilhas River
 Turvo River
 Uruguay River
 Vacacaí River
 Vacacaí-Mirim River
 Da Várzea River

References
 Map from Ministry of Transport
  GEOnet Names Server

 
Rio Grande do Sul
Environment of Rio Grande do Sul